Avec les Hommes de l'eau is a Belgian 1938 short documentary film.

Synopsis 
The Berwinne sails off Leopoldville (now known as Kinshasa) up the Congo River. Along the way, it stops at a small village to take on board a plentiful supply of slow-burning wood. Once loaded, the boat sails away, leaving a mesmerised local population behind on the shore. Along the route, the boat encounters canoes and "watermen" carrying out typical activities such as fishing, crocodile hunting, carving hippopotamus meat and salting it for preservation.

References

External links

1938 documentary films
1938 films
Black-and-white documentary films
1938 short films
1930s short documentary films
Belgian short documentary films
Documentary films about water transport
Congo River
Documentary films about the Democratic Republic of the Congo
Democratic Republic of the Congo short documentary films
Belgian black-and-white films